Musty Musketeers is a 1954 short subject directed by Jules White starring American slapstick comedy team The Three Stooges (Moe Howard, Larry Fine and Shemp Howard). It is the 154th entry in the series released by Columbia Pictures starring the comedians, who released 190 shorts for the studio between 1934 and 1959.

Plot
The Stooges wish to marry their sweethearts, but are forbidden by Old King Cole (Vernon Dent) until Princess Alisha (Virginia Hunter) weds Prince Gallant III of Rhododendron "when the flowers bloom in the Spring." Unfortunately, evil magician Murgatroyd (Philip Van Zandt) has his own plans to marry Alisha, and promptly abducts her. The Stooges do their best to foil his plot.

Cast

Credited
 Moe Howard as Moe
 Larry Fine as Larry
 Shemp Howard as Shemp
 Vernon Dent as King Cole
 Philip Van Zandt as Mergatroyd the Magician

Uncredited
 Virginia Hunter as Princess Alicia (stock footage)
 Wanda Perry as Princess Alicia
 Heinie Conklin as Guard
 Johnny Kascier as Guard
 Joe Palma as Lancier the Captain of the Guard
 Frank Sully as King's aide
 Al Thompson as King's aide (stock footage)
 Norma Randall as Millieth
 Ruth White as Lillieth
 Diana Darrin as Tillieth
 Sherry O'Neil as Showgirl
 Cy Schindell as Fat Guard (stock footage)

Production notes
Musty Musketeers is a remake of 1948's Fiddlers Three, using ample recycled footage. The short's new scenes include a marriage proposal at the beginning with their sweethearts, as well as those at the end with a comic sword fight with actor Philip Van Zandt. Hunter was unavailable for the new footage, so she was replaced by Wanda Perry, who holds a fan over her face. New footage was shot on April 27, 1953.

Quote
Moe (to Shemp): "Thou art the matzohead!"

References

External links 
 
 
Musty Musketeers at threestooges.net

1954 films
1954 comedy films
The Three Stooges films
American black-and-white films
Fiction set in Roman Britain
Arthurian films
The Three Stooges film remakes
Films directed by Jules White
Columbia Pictures short films
1950s English-language films
American comedy short films
1950s American films